The Philips Tele-Game series was a series of six dedicated first-generation home video game consoles manufactured, released and marketed between 1975 to 1978 by Dutch company Philips.

All Philips Tele-Game consoles have the contraction "ES" which stands for "elektronisches Spiel" (German for "electronic game"). The systems are named differently depending on the country (Tele-Spiel in Germany, Tele-Game in Great Britain, Tele-Peli in Finland, and Tele-Spel in the Netherlands). In all countries, the name means tele game. The Philips Tele-Game consoles were some of the first European video game consoles ever to be released.

Models

ES 2201 

The Philips Tele-Game ES 2201 was the first console of the Philips Tele-Game series and was sold from late 1975 to 1976 for 150 Deutsche Mark (DM) (converted 61 Euro) or 400 Franc. The score is not displayed on screen, hence there are two sliders for the score on the case ranging from 0 to 15. It can only output black and white.

Games 

Five games were available for the system in form of cartridges: Badminton, Pelota, Skeet Shooting, Racing and Ghostchaser. All of those games (except Badminton which was in the delivery) were sold for 25 DM or 45 Franc. On these cartridges isn't a program, there are just a few wires that connect electrically a few parts of the intern console hardware so that a game appears on the screen.

ES 2203 Las Vegas 
The Philips Tele-Game ES 2203 Las Vegas is the second console in the Philips Tele-Game series. It was released in 1977 and has six integrated games instead of four commercially available games through the built-in Pong video game circuit AY-3-8500; Pong, soccer, squash, practice and two shooting games that can be played with a separately available light gun. Otherwise, the device is identical to the previous console ES 2201. The console was not a success due to its high price, which is why it was later reissued with the Philips Tele-Game ES 2207 Travemünde in a cheaper version in the same year.

ES 2204 Las Vegas 
The Philips Tele-Game ES 2204 Las Vegas, released in 1977, is the third console in the series and uses an AY-3-8500. Otherwise the system is identical to the model ES 2203.

ES 2207 Travemünde 
The Philips Tele-Game ES 2207 Travemünde is a cheaper new edition of the ES 2203. It was released in 1977 and also uses a AY-3-8500. It is powered by a power supply (7,6 V/260 mA).

ES 2208 Las Vegas 
The Philips Tele-Game ES 2208 Las Vegas is the fifth console in the Philips Tele-Game series and was released in 1977. For the first time, the system's joysticks offer 2-dimensional instead of 1-dimensional movements. It uses an AY-3-8550 and therefore can output color and has a mass of ca. 800 g. It is powered by a 9 V DC power supply. Otherwise, the system is identical to the model ES 2204.

ES 2218 Las Vegas 
The Philips Tele-Game ES 2218 Las Vegas is the sixth and last console in the Philips Tele-Game series. It was released in 1977. For the first time, it offers eight instead of just six integrated games. The device is otherwise identical to the model ES 2208 Las Vegas, with the only difference that it has an integrated AY-3-8600 chip. This console was also available as a self-building kit with the designation EB 7601.

External links 

Philips Tele-Spiel series on www.pong-story.com
Philips Tele-Spiel ES 2201 at www.old-computers.com
Cover from the German newspaper "Das Spielzeug" with the Philips Tele-Spiel ES 2201 from September 1975
German newspaper article about the Philips Tele-Spiel ES 2201 from April 1975
Commercial for the Philips Tele-Spiel ES 2201
Instruction manual for the Philips-Tele-Spiel ES 2201 (in German)

References 

Dedicated consoles
First-generation video game consoles
Home video game consoles
Philips products